Audrix is a commune in the Dordogne department in Nouvelle-Aquitaine in southwestern France.

Population

The local population is named "Audrixois".

Since 2006, the official numbers can be found on Insee. Now the census will refer to an annual data collection, regarding all the local territories over a period of five years. For municipalities of less than 10 000 inhabitants, the census will be held only every 5 years.

Local Culture and Heritage

Audrix was first found written in the XIIIe century, mentioned as Audris. This place was occupied during the Gallo-Romaine period, resulting to a Romane church build over the XIIe century, still worth visiting.
This unique name refers to a German person: Audricus or Aldrik.

Transmitter

A Television and radio transmitter station is situated near Audrix. The elevation of the site is 240 m above sea level. The pylon height is 200 m.

FM
4 transmitters:
 France Inter 92.3
 France Culture 94.0
 France Musique 97.1
 France Bleu Périgord 99.0

Television
(H = horizontal polarization and V = vertical polarization)
3 UHF transmitters broadcasting at  255 kW PAR
 TF1 37 (H)
 France 2 34 (H)
 France 3 31 (H)

2 UHF transmitters broadcasting at 90 kW PAR
 France 5/Arte 66 (V)
 M6 58 (V)

1 UHF transmitter broadcasting at 3.5 kW PAR
 Aquitv 25(H)

Digital television
6 UHF (multiplex) transmitters broadcasting at 10 kW at PAR with restriction of certain frequencies.
 R1 33 (H) : France 2, France 3 Périgords, France 4, France 5, Arte, LCP / Public Sénat
 R2 42 (H) : I-Télé, BFM TV, Direct 8, Gulli, Europe 2 TV, TMC
 R3 45 (H) : Canal+, Canal+ Cinéma, Canal+ Sport, Planète, Canal J
 R4 39 (H) : M6, W9, TF6, Paris Première, AB1, NT1
 R5 22 (H) : (not used)
 R6 30 (H) : TF1, LCI, Eurosport France, TPS Star, NRJ 12

See also
Communes of the Dordogne department

References

External links

 Audrix in the map of France

Communes of Dordogne